In enzymology, a methylarsonate reductase is an enzyme that catalyzes the chemical reaction

methylarsonate + 2 glutathione  methylarsonite + glutathione disulfide + H2O

Thus, the two substrates of this enzyme are methylarsonate and glutathione, whereas its 3 products are methylarsonite, glutathione disulfide, and H2O.

This enzyme belongs to the family of oxidoreductases, specifically those acting on phosphorus or arsenic in donor with disulfide as acceptor.  The systematic name of this enzyme class is gluthathione:methylarsonate oxidoreductase. This enzyme is also called MMA(V) reductase.

References

 

EC 1.20.4
Enzymes of unknown structure